Berg am Irchel is a municipality in the district of Andelfingen in the canton of Zürich in Switzerland.

History
Berg am Irchel is first mentioned around 1100 as Berga.  In 1243 it was mentioned as Berge.

Geography

Of this area, 48.2% is used for agricultural purposes, while 44.8% is forested. Of the rest of the land, 5.7% is settled (buildings or roads) and the remainder (1.3%) is non-productive (rivers, glaciers or mountains).

The municipality is located on a terrace on the northern slope of the Irchel elevation.  It includes the village of Berg  Gräslikon (which left Buch am Irchel in 1855 to join Berg).  In 1619 Oberdorf left the municipality, in 1775 Schloss Schollenberg left and in 1788 Ziegelhütte left as well, all three joining Flaach.

Demographics
, 3.8% of the population was made up of foreign nationals. Over the last 10 years the population has grown at a rate of 4.3%. Most of the population speaks German  (95.3%), with English being second most common ( 1.0%) and Albanian being third ( 1.0%).

In the 2007 election the most popular party was the SVP which received 52.3% of the vote.  The next three most popular parties were the CSP (11.3%), the Green Party (10.2%) and the SPS (9.5%).

The age distribution of the population is children and teenagers (0–19 years old) make up 28.3% of the population, while adults (20–64 years old) make up 61.1% and seniors (over 64 years old) make up 10.6%.  The entire Swiss population is generally well educated.  In Berg am Irchel about 79.2% of the population (between age 25-64) have completed either non-mandatory upper secondary education or additional higher education (either university or a Fachhochschule).

Berg am Irchel has an unemployment rate of 0.3%.  , there were 57 people employed in the primary economic sector and about 28 businesses involved in this sector.  28 people are employed in the secondary sector and there are 12 businesses in this sector.  43 people are employed in the tertiary sector, with 13 businesses in this sector.
The historical population is given in the following table:

  including Gräslikon, though until 1855 it was part of Buch am Irchel.

References

External links 

  
 

Municipalities of the canton of Zürich